Otiorhynchus carinatopunctatus is a species of broad-nosed weevil in the beetle family Curculionidae. It is native to Europe and introduced in North America.

Nomenclature
This species was wrongly identified with Curculio scaber Linnaeus, 1758 from 1898 on. When reinspected, types proved not identical with this species at all, but to the species then known as Trachyphloeus bifoveolatus.

References

Further reading

External links

 

Entiminae
Articles created by Qbugbot
Beetles described in 1783